Malestroit is a commune in the Morbihan department of Brittany in north-western France.INSEE commune file The town is on the river Oust and part of the Nantes-Brest canal. It has several half-timbered houses.

Twinning
Malestroit, whose inhabitants are known in French as Malestroyens, are twinned with the town of Jedburgh in the United Kingdom.

Tourism
Malestroit was on the Nantes-Brest canal, but it is no longer completely navigable. However, the section through the town in over 200 km long, and barges moor up near the centre of Malestroit. It is possible to hire a boat to explore the waterway. The nearby village of St. Marcel houses a museum dedicated to the Breton Resistance movement where a battle against the Nazis took place and was won by the Resistance fighters.

See also
Communes of the Morbihan department

References

External links

 Mayors of Morbihan Association 
Guide to Malestroit and Property in the Area 

Communes of Morbihan